Margaret Shelton may refer to:

Margaret (Madge) Shelton, possible mistress of Henry VIII of England
Margaret Shelton (artist) (1915–1983), Canadian artist
Meg Shelton (died 1705), alleged witch
 Margaret Sheldon, one of two known as "Doughnut Girls" (or "Doughnut Dollies"); see National Doughnut Day